The Chester teapot is billed as the "World's Largest Teapot", which measures  in height by  in diameter. Its current location is on the former site of a popular amusement park, Rock Springs Park (1897–1970), off an onramp along U.S. Highway 30 in the City of Chester in Hancock County, West Virginia.

History 
It was originally brought to Chester in 1938 to represent the largest pottery industry in the world at that time. The teapot was originally a Hires Root Beer sign in the shape of a large barrel and was converted into a teapot upon its arrival in Chester. The teapot underwent restorations in 1990 and 2007 by the citizens of Chester. By coincidence Charles Elmer Hires' root beer may also have had its inspiration in a kind of herbal tea.

Gallery

See also
American tea culture
Teapot Dome Service Station

References

External links 
Official Chester WV Site - World's Largest Teapot
History of the World's Largest Teapot
World's Largest Roadside Attractions article

Buildings and structures in Hancock County, West Virginia
Landmarks in West Virginia
Tourist attractions in Hancock County, West Virginia
Roadside attractions in West Virginia
Novelty buildings in West Virginia
Teapots